Arecatannins are a class of condensed tannins in the sub-class procyanidins contained in the seeds of Areca catechu also called betel nut. The arecatannin-type natural products from Ceylonese cassia bark and Areca seed are examples of polyphenols by both current definitions, and fit the distinct definition of a polymeric phenol as well.

Known molecules 
The following six known arecatannins have been detected in A. catechu seeds.

 Arecatannin A1
 Arecatannin A2
 Arecatannin A3
 Arecatannin B1
 Arecatannin B2
 Arecatannin C1

References 

Phytochemicals
Polyphenols
Procyanidins
Tannins